Kaleigh Elizabeth Cronin (born April 12, 1989) is an American actress and singer, best known for appearing on the third and fourth seasons of the revival of the PBS Kids television show ZOOM in the early 2000s and her work on Broadway.

References

External links

1989 births
Living people
21st-century American singers
American actresses
21st-century American women